The men's 400 metres hurdles competition of the athletics events at the 2019 Pan American Games will take place between the 6 and 8 of August at the 2019 Pan American Games Athletics Stadium. The defending Pan American Games champion is Jeffery Gibson from the Bahamas.

Summary
Leading semi-finalist Juander Santos continued his domination of the field, building to a significant 3 step lead on his nearest chaser by the 8th hurdle.  He began to pay for his early speed, slowing as he turned for home.  Alison dos Santos was gaining over the 9th hurdle and Juander could sense a challenge coming as he stretched his steps to get over the 10th.  Juander's lead foot hit the hurdle squarely and he crashed to the ground.  Clearing it cleanly, Alison cruised in, hands outstretched, to an easy win.

Records
Prior to this competition, the existing world and Pan American Games records were as follows:

Schedule

Results
All times shown are in seconds.

Semifinal
Qualification: First 3 in each heat (Q) and next 2 fastest (q) qualified for the final. The results were as follows:

Final
The results were as follows:

References

Athletics at the 2019 Pan American Games
2019